Patricia Elaine Joan Rodgers (born 13 July 1948) is a Bahamian diplomat who served as the permanent secretary in the Ministry of Foreign Affairs, the High Commissioner in the United Kingdom (16 May 1988 – 30 October 1992), and in Canada.  In 2014, Rodgers was awarded the Janet Bostwick Medal for Women in the Foreign Service.

Education
Rodgers holds a Master of Arts degree in English from the University of Aberdeen (1970), and a Diploma in International Relations from the University of the West Indies St Augustine, Trinidad (1972), and a PhD from the Graduate Institute of International Studies in Geneva (1981).

Books 

 Midocean archipelagos and international law: A study in the progressive development of international law. Vantage Press. 1981. .

References

1948 births
Alumni of the University of Aberdeen
Bahamian women ambassadors
High Commissioners of the Bahamas to Canada
High Commissioners of the Bahamas to the United Kingdom
Living people
University of the West Indies alumni
Graduate Institute of International and Development Studies alumni